Nasiru Ado Bayero, OFR  (born 2 February 1964) is a Nigerian banker and businessman. He is the current Emir of Bichi, a Nigerian traditional state, Kano State, Nigeria. He ascended the throne from his brother Aminu Ado Bayero who was named as the Emir of Kano, following the deposition of his nephew Muhammad Sanusi II by Governor Abdullahi Umar Ganduje. Prior to his accession, Bayero was the Chiroma of Kano Emirate and district head of Nassarawa during the reign of Muhammad Sanusi II.

Early life

Family
Bayero was born on 2 February 1964 in Kano, to late Ado Bayero who was the longest serving Emir of Kano in the history of Kano. He is the third son of late Ado Bayero and was the first child born at the official residence of Kano Emirate known as Gidan Dabo. His elder siblings include Sanusi Ado Bayero the former Chiroma from 1990 to 2015 which he later succeeded, and Aminu Ado Bayero the 15th Emir of Kano.

Education
Bayero had his primary and secondary school education in Kano, from where he proceeded to University of Maiduguri in Borno State to study Mass Communication in 1987, he is a graduate of Harvard Business School as well as having certificate in German language in 1993.

Career
Bayero had experience working with Continental Merchant Bank Nigeria, he later moved to Coastal Corporation in Houston, Texas and then Hamlet Investment Ltd London. He is the chairman of Enclo Limited, 9 Mobile Nigeria.

Titles and engagement
On 6 May 1994, Bayero was appointed as Tafidan Kano and district head of Waje by his late father the 13th Emir of Kano and later transferred as district head of Nassarawa local government, and then to Tarauni on the same status. He was promoted to Turakin Kano.In 2015, the 14th Emir of Kano Muhammad Sanusi II appointed him as Chiroma of Kano.

Emir of Bichi

Accession
On 9 March 2019, Bayero ascended the throne following his brother Aminu Ado Bayero appointment as the 15th Emir of Kano.

References

External links
Nasir Ado Bayero
Meet Nasiru Ado Bayero 

1964 births
Living people
University of Maiduguri alumni
Nigerian Fula people
Nigerian Muslims
Nigerian traditional rulers
Harvard Business School alumni
Nigerian chairpersons of corporations